Grès or Gres may refer to:

 The French fashion house of Grès
 Stoneware, a type of ceramic
 Earthenware, a type of ceramic

See also
 GRES (disambiguation)
 GRE (disambiguation)